Redouane Zerzouri (born 27 April 1989) is a French professional footballer who plays as an attacking midfielder for Raja Beni Mellal.

Career
In January 2019, he moved to Berkane.

References

External links
 

1989 births
Living people
French footballers
Association football midfielders
Racing Club de France Football players
U.S. Cremonese players
Como 1907 players
C.S. Visé players
AS FAR (football) players
Madura United F.C. players
PS TIRA players
UKM F.C. players
RS Berkane players
Botola players
Serie C players
Championnat National 2 players
Championnat National 3 players
Liga 1 (Indonesia) players
Challenger Pro League players
French sportspeople of Moroccan descent
French Muslims
French expatriate footballers
French expatriate sportspeople in Italy
French expatriate sportspeople in Belgium
French expatriate sportspeople in Indonesia
French expatriate sportspeople in Malaysia
Expatriate footballers in Italy
Expatriate footballers in Belgium
Expatriate footballers in Indonesia
Expatriate footballers in Malaysia
Expatriate footballers in Morocco
French expatriate sportspeople in Morocco
Sportspeople from Colombes
Footballers from Hauts-de-Seine